This list of botanical gardens and arboretums in Delaware is intended to include all significant botanical gardens and arboretums in the U.S. state of Delaware

See also
List of botanical gardens and arboretums in the United States

References 

 
Arboreta in Delaware
botanical gardens and arboretums in Delaware